Rubén Ramírez may refer to:

 Rubén Ramírez Lezcano (born 1966), Paraguayan politician
 Rubén Ramírez Hidalgo (born 1978), Spanish tennis player
 Rubén Ramírez (footballer, born 1982), Argentine footballer
 Rubén Ramírez (footballer, born 1995), Venezuelan footballer